Ammanuel Benjamin Ghareeb is a Kuwaiti pastor of the Kuwait Presbyterian Church and the chairman of the National Evangelical Church of Kuwait, a campus where nearly 100 Christian denominations gather for prayer. He is the first Gulf Arab to become head of a Protestant church. His father's family are Assyrians originally from southeast Turkey.

References

Protestantism in Kuwait
Chrisitan
Kuwaiti people of Turkish descent
Living people
Year of birth missing (living people)